Kasso Akochayé Okoudjou is a Professor of Mathematics at Tufts University. He works primarily on harmonic analysis and is currently also doing research in time-frequency analysis and fractals. He was the 2018 Martin Luther King Visiting Professor at the Massachusetts Institute of Technology.

Education and early career 
Okoudjou studied mathematics at the University of Abomey-Calavi, earning a maîtrise (bachelor's degree) in 1996. He became an instructor at the Complexe Scolaire William Ponty de Porto-Novo in Bénin. In 1998 he joined the Georgia Institute of Technology for his graduate studies. He earned his PhD, Characterization of function spaces and boundedness properties of bilinear pseudodifferential operators through Gabor frames, in 2003 for research supervised by Christopher Edward Heil. He was awarded the Sigma Xi Best PhD Thesis Award.

Research 
Okoudjou was appointed H. C. Wang Assistant Professor at Cornell University in 2003. In 2005 he joined Erwin Schrödinger International Institute for Mathematical Physics in Vienna. He moved to the University of Maryland, College Park in 2006, then to Tufts University in 2020, after a 2-year appointment at Massachusetts Institute of Technology as MLK Visiting Professor.

In 2018 Okoudjou was awarded a National Science Foundation grant to develop digital signal processing. He applies Frame Theory to the redundancy of data for Quantum Information. He uses the Zauner conjecture and Heil-Ramanathan-Topiwala conjecture.

Okoudjou's accomplishments have earned him recognition by Mathematically Gifted & Black as a Black History Month 2019 Honoree.

In June 2020 Okoudjou was appointed co-chair of the American Mathematical Society (AMS) task force on racial discrimination. His appointment came in the wake of a nationwide reckoning on racial justice. The task force published its report in March 2021.

Books 
2016: Finite Frame Theory: A Complete Introduction to Overcompleteness - Proceedings of Symposia in Applied Mathematics

References 

Cornell University faculty
University of Benin (Nigeria) alumni
Georgia Tech alumni
African-American mathematicians
University of Maryland, College Park faculty
Massachusetts Institute of Technology faculty
Year of birth missing (living people)
Living people
21st-century African-American people